Henry J. Prominski (September 4, 1929 – April 1, 2006) was an American politician. He served as a Republican member for the 86th district of the Florida House of Representatives.

Life and career 
Prominski was born in New Brunswick, New Jersey. He attended the University of Pennsylvania, the University of Miami School of Law and McGill University.

In 1966, Prominski was elected to the Florida House of Representatives. The next year, he was elected as the first representative for the newly-established 86th district of the Florida House of Representatives. He served until 1970, when he was succeeded by Jon C. Thomas.

Prominski died in April 2006, at the age of 76.

References 

1929 births
2006 deaths
Politicians from New Brunswick, New Jersey
Republican Party members of the Florida House of Representatives
20th-century American politicians
University of Pennsylvania alumni
University of Miami School of Law alumni
McGill University alumni